Alona Anatoliïvna Andruk (born 11 June 1987) is a Ukrainian road bicycle racer, entrepreneur and businesswoman. She competed at the 2012 Summer Olympics in the Women's road race, but finished over the time limit.

In 2014 she founded Take Off Ltd.

External links 
 

Ukrainian female cyclists
1987 births
Sportspeople from Kyiv
Living people
Olympic cyclists of Ukraine
Cyclists at the 2012 Summer Olympics
21st-century Ukrainian women